Tankville is an unincorporated community in Alexander County, Illinois, United States. Tankville is located along the Mississippi River west of Horseshoe Lake.

References

Unincorporated communities in Alexander County, Illinois
Unincorporated communities in Illinois
Cape Girardeau–Jackson metropolitan area